"Fake it till you make it" (or "Fake it until you make it") is an aphorism that suggests that by imitating confidence, competence, and an optimistic mindset, a person can realize those qualities in their real life and achieve the results they seek.

The phrase is first attested some time before 1973.  The earliest reference to a similar phrase occurs in the Simon & Garfunkel song "Fakin' It", released in 1968 as a single and also on their Bookends album. Simon sings, "And I know I'm fakin' it, I'm not really makin' it."

Similar advice has been offered by a number of writers over time:

In the Law of attraction movement, "act as if you already have it", or simply "act as if", is a central concept:

In psychology 

In the 1920s, Alfred Adler developed a therapeutic technique that he called "acting as if", asserting that "if you want a quality, act as if you already have it". This strategy gave his clients an opportunity to practice alternatives to dysfunctional behaviors. Adler's method is still used today and is often described as role play.

"Faking it till you make it" is a psychological tool validated by neuroscientific research. A 1988 experiment by Fritz Strack showed that mood can be improved by holding a pen between the user's teeth to force a smile. However, a 2022 study on the use of forced smiling and neutral expressions to counter emotional distress found it less effective than other strategies of emotional regulation.

See also
Fritz Strack
Faking It
 "Fake It Till You Make It Some More", episode of Orange Is the New Black

References

Aphorisms
Failure
Slogans
1968 neologisms